Someone She Knows is a 1994 NBC television film directed by Eric Laneuville and starring Markie Post, Gerald McRaney, Jeffrey Nordling and Spencer Garrett as main characters. It was filmed in Valencia, Santa Clarita, California.

Plot Summary
Based on a true story, the film follows a young mother's search to bring her daughter's killer to justice.

Laurie Phillips (Markie Post) is distraught when her five-year-old daughter Marilee (Sarah Freeman) is discovered murdered.  Increasingly frustrated by the inabilities of the local police to find the killer, Laurie turns to an old friend of the family, State Trooper Frank Mayfield (Gerald McRaney) and soon reaches the terrifying conclusion that the guilty individual may be someone she knows.

Cast
 Markie Post as Laurie Philips
 Gerald McRaney as Frank Mayfield
 Jeffrey Nordling as Greg Philips
 Spencer Garrett as Lt. Harry Kramer
 Harold Sylvester as Lt. Jack Emery
 Sharon Lawrence as Sharon
 Phillip Van Dyke as Cash Gardner
 Jamie Renée Smith as Brandy Gardner
 Sarah Freeman as Marilee Philip
 Alma Beltran as Thelma Lambeth
 Jeff Doucette as Deputy Olsen

References

External links
 

1994 television films
1994 films
1994 thriller films
Films about murder
NBC original programming
Warner Bros. films
American thriller television films
1990s English-language films
1990s American films